Kesath is a village and corresponding community development block in Buxar district of Bihar, India. It is the least populous of Buxar's 11 blocks, with a population of 33,820, in 5,304 households. The population of Kesath itself is 14,843, in 2,351 households.

Demographics 

Kesath is an entirely rural block, with no large urban centres. Its sex ratio as of 2011 was 942 females to every 1000 males, which was higher than the overall district ratio of 922. The sex ratio was lower in the 0-6 age bracket, with 921 females for every 1000 males. Members of scheduled castes made up 17.61% of the block population and members of scheduled tribes made up 0.45%. The block literacy rate was 71.1%, which was slightly higher than the overall district rate of 70.14%. There was a 21.72% literacy gender gap between men (81.67%) and women (59.95%), compared to the district-wide gap of 22.09%.

Employment 
Most of Kesath block's workforce was engaged in agriculture in 2011, with 28.33% being cultivators who owned their own land and another 40.30% being agricultural labourers who worked someone else's land for wages. Another 4.36% were household industry workers, and the remaining 27.01% were other workers.

Amenities 
As of 2011, Kesath was the only village in its block to have access to tap water, with the other 14 villages relying primarily on hand pump for drinking water. It was also the only village in the block to have either a regular mandi or a weekly haat, as well as the only one with a bank. 12 villages in the block had electricity for domestic use, but Kesath was the only one with electricity for all uses (including agricultural and commercial). It had a recreation centre with sports fields along with a public library.

Villages 
Kesath block comprises 15 villages, all of which are inhabited:

References 

Villages in Buxar district